William H. Dolben (January 23, 1878 – June 6, 1948) was an American politician who was in  the Massachusetts House of Representatives, and the Massachusetts Executive Council.

Massachusetts House of Representatives
Dolben represented the twenty sixth Middlesex District in the Massachusetts House of Representatives. In 1913 Dolben served on the Committee on Metropolitan Affairs, in 1914 he served on the Committee on Metropolitan Affairs and on the Committee on Federal Affairs.

Massachusetts Executive Council
On January 23, 1922 Dolben was elected, by the Massachusetts General Court, to the Massachusetts Executive Council, replacing John C. F. Slayton who had died in office, Dolben was sworn in on January 24, 1922.

Dolben was from Somerville, Massachusetts.

References

1878 births
1948 deaths
Republican Party members of the Massachusetts House of Representatives
Politicians from Somerville, Massachusetts